Clinton McKenzie (born 15 September 1955) is a former British professional boxer. He fought in the light welterweight division and became the British light welterweight title holder and briefly held the European title.

Background
McKenzie was born in Clarendon, Jamaica, the oldest of seven children. The McKenzie family emigrated to England when Clinton was nine years of age.

He is the brother of former three-weight world champion boxer Duke McKenzie and former amateur boxer and politician Winston McKenzie, father of footballer-turn boxer Leon McKenzie and adoptive father to professional boxer and Big Brother UK 2009 housemate, Angel McKenzie.

Amateur career
McKenzie represented England and Great Britain throughout his amateur career which culminated in representing Great Britain at the 1976 Olympics in Montreal, Canada. McKenzie won his first two fights before losing to eventual gold medal winner Sugar Ray Leonard. He won the 1976 Amateur Boxing Association British light-welterweight title, when boxing out of the Sir Philip Game ABC.

Olympic results 
1976 (as a light welterweight)
Defeated Daniele Zappaterra (ITA), 5:0
Defeated Ismael Martínez (PUR), 3:2
Lost to Ray Leonard (USA), 5:0

Professional career
Following the publicity of the Olympic Games, McKenzie left amateur boxing to turn professional in October 1976, winning his first fight at the York Hall, Bethnal Green, London, in which McKenzie beat Jimmy King on points over eight rounds.

McKenzie fought for his first title belt, the vacant British light welterweight title, in October 1978 which he won with a ten-round knockout win over Jim Montague in Belfast, Northern Ireland. The following year, McKenzie lost the title at the Wembley Conference Centre to Colin Powers on points but later that year defeated Powers at the same venue to regain the title.

References

External links
 

1974 births
Living people
English male boxers
English people of Jamaican descent
Jamaican emigrants to the United Kingdom
People from Clarendon Parish, Jamaica
People from Croydon
Olympic boxers of Great Britain
Boxers at the 1976 Summer Olympics
Boxers from Greater London
Light-welterweight boxers